Luis Alberto Quintero Largo (born April 14, 1990 in Chíquiza) is a Colombian cyclist.

Doping ban 
Largo tested positive for 19-norandrosterone and noretiocholanolone in an out-of-competition control 22 January 2014 and was subsequently handed a two-year ban from sport. He had just arrived in Europe to ride as a neo-pro for pro continental team Colombia at the time of the test, and he lost his contract with the team because of the anti-doping rule violation.

Major results 
2010
 1st Stage 1 Vuelta a Colombia Under-23 (TTT)
2012
 3rd Overall Vuelta a Boyacá
2013
 1st  Overall Vuelta a Cundinamarca
1st Stage 1

References 

1990 births
Living people
Doping cases in cycling
Colombian sportspeople in doping cases
Colombian male cyclists
Sportspeople from Boyacá Department